Dale Hausner and Samuel Dieteman were a duo of serial killers, spree killers, arsonists and thrill killers who committed several drive-by shootings and arsons in Phoenix, Arizona, between May 2005 and August 2006. They targeted random pedestrians and animals, mostly doing so while under the influence of methamphetamine, and also set fire to multiple objects. Investigations of their crimes coincided with the search for the Baseline Killer, who was also committing random murders and sexual assaults in the Phoenix area.

After being found guilty of 80 of 88 felony charges in one single trial including murder, attempted murder, arson, animal cruelty and drive-by-shootings, Hausner was sentenced to death 6 times, and later committed suicide in prison. Dieteman was sentenced to life imprisonment without possibility of parole. Investigators believe they were responsible for eight murders and at least 29 other shootings. Hausner's brother Jeff had assisted in some of the shootings, and he was sentenced to 25 years in prison.

Crimes
In addition to several dozen non-fatal shootings of people and fatal shootings of animals, Hausner and Dieteman were found guilty of the following murders:

David Estrada (20) shot to death on June 29, 2005 in Tolleson, Arizona.

Nathaniel Shoffner (44) murdered on November 11, 2005 while attempting to protect a dog from being shot.

Jose Ortiz (44) and Marco Carillo (28) were murdered on December 29, 2005.

Claudia Gutierrez-Cruz (20) shot and killed by Dieteman on May 2, 2006, as Hausner drove in Scottsdale, Arizona.

The serial shooters' last crime occurred July 30, 2006 in Mesa, Arizona. According to police, Robin Blasnek (22) was shot and killed at approximately 11:15 p.m. while walking from her parents' house to a friend's house after having an argument with her boyfriend. On August 3, Phoenix police released a statement linking Blasnek's murder to the serial shooter, citing forensic evidence and other similarities to the serial shooter's past crimes.

Prior to that, they shot pedestrians, cyclists, dogs, and horses. Phoenix police originally believed that the serial shooter was a single individual responsible for 4 murders and 25 shootings beginning in May 2005, and that a series of 13 shootings in the same area were the work of another offender. However, on July 11, 2006, investigators revealed that they believed the two series of shootings were related.

Perpetrators
 Dale Shawn Hausner, 33, had worked as a custodian at Phoenix Sky Harbor International Airport since 1999 as well as a boxing photojournalist for RingSports and Fightnews.com.
 Samuel John Dieteman, 31, had a history of petty crimes such as shoplifting and drunk driving and had returned to Arizona a few years prior from Minnesota.

Capture
Tips identified Hausner and Dieteman as suspects on July 31, 2006. The most important tip came from Ron Horton, a friend of Dieteman, who said Dieteman had confessed to involvement in the shootings while drinking. Horton was at first uncertain whether Dieteman's confession was serious, but went to police after the shooting death of Robin Blasnek, which he said "affected me quite a bit" due to a belief Horton might have prevented her death had he contacted police earlier.

On August 3, 2006, police arrested both suspects outside of their apartment in Mesa. On the morning of August 4, 2006, Phoenix police announced that two arrests had been made in connection with the serial shooter. Authorities said they also linked Hausner and Dieteman to two arson fires at Wal-Mart stores on June 8 in Glendale, Arizona, started 45 minutes apart from each other that caused approximately $7 to $10 million in damages.

A few weeks prior to his capture, Hausner interviewed former Heavyweight boxing champion Mike Tyson as part of his sports journalism job. Police questioned Tyson regarding his brief meeting with Hausner, and the boxer later described Hausner as "...a small guy, but a nice guy."

Trial
Hausner was charged with 88 crimes in 5 different indictments attributed to the serial shooter investigation, including 8 murders, 18 attempted murders, 17 aggravated assaults, 26 drive-by shootings, 4 firearms charges, 10 cruelty to animals charges and 2 arson of an occupied structure charges.  Hausner was convicted on 6 of 8 murders, and 80 charges overall on March 13, 2009.

Hausner's former roommate, Samuel Dieteman, has pleaded guilty to two murders, plus conspiracy to commit some of the other related murders. Dieteman received a sentence of life without parole.

On March 27, 2009, Hausner was sentenced to six death sentences. Hausner had instructed his attorneys not to oppose a death sentence, saying his execution would help the victims' families heal. After a mandatory appeal, Hausner waived further appeals and requested to be put to death "as soon as possible."
During Hausner's half-hour statement to the jury before sentencing, he apologized to several people including his family and compared himself to Charles Manson.

On June 19, 2013, Hausner was found unresponsive in his cell and died later that day. His autopsy revealed no physical trauma. The medical examiner determined that he had killed himself with an overdose of an anti-depressant.

Suspected victims 
Although Hausner was convicted for murdering six people, he is suspected to have killed two more people in 2005:

Tony Mendez (39) was shot to death on May 17, 2005.

Reginald Remillard (56) was shot to death on May 24, 2005.

See also 
 Phoenix freeway shootings, a series of shootings in 2015 along Interstate 10 in Phoenix
 Maryvale serial shooter, a similar serial killer or killers also operating in Phoenix in 2016.

General:
 List of serial killers in the United States

References

External links
 Timeline of  Serial Shooter Crimes – Shootings, Animal Shootings, and Homicides

2005 in Arizona
2005 murders in the United States
2006 in Arizona
2006 murders in the United States
2000s in Phoenix, Arizona
21st-century American criminals
American male criminals
American serial killers
Criminal duos
Drive-by shootings
Male serial killers
Murder in Arizona